Rõusa  is a village in Põhja-Pärnumaa Parish, Pärnu County in western-central Estonia. The village is located at coordinates 58°40′N 25°07′E.

Journalist, writer and feminist Lilli Suburg (1841–1923) was born in Rõusa Manor.

References

 

Villages in Pärnu County